Common Ground is a 1916 silent film drama produced by Jesse Lasky, directed by William C. deMille and distributed by Paramount Pictures. It is an original story for the screen and stars Thomas Meighan and Marie Doro. A print is held by British Film Institute National Film and Television Archive.

Cast
Marie Doro as The Kid
Thomas Meighan as Judge David Evans
Theodore Roberts as James Mordant
Mary Mersch as Doris Mordant
Horace B. Carpenter as Burke
Florence Smythe as Mrs. Dupont
Mrs. Lewis McCord as Housekeeper
Dr. Keller as Jones

References

External links

still of a scene with Thomas Meighan and Marie Doro

1916 films
American silent feature films
Films directed by William C. deMille
1916 drama films
Silent American drama films
American black-and-white films
1910s American films